Promise Osita Egbo (born 2 February 1988 in Sokoto) is a Nigerian football defender and midfielder.

International 
In 2008 he was a player of the national football team of Nigeria U-20.

Career 
Osita began his career with the Eagle Cement. Later he went to Nigerian Premier League club Kano Pillars F.C. In 2006, he signed with Odd Grenland Norway, and played with the club for one year before he was transferred to Tunisian top side Atletic Bizet. In 2008, he joined the Vietnamese V-league club Thanh Hóa F.C. After a weekly impressive performance at Thanh Hóa F.C he was bought by v-League rival Bình Dương F.C. in late 2009, in this time he help the team to reach into the Semi-Finals of AFC Cup.

Club history:

2004/2005 = Kano Pillars F.C.

2005/2006 = Odd Grenland

2006/2007 = Atletic Bizet

2007/2008 = Thanh Hóa F.C.

2008/2009 = Thanh Hóa F.C.

2009/2010 = Bình Dương F.C.

2010/2011 = Bình Dương F.C.

2012/2013 = Racing FC Union Luxembourg

2014/2016 = Abia Warriors FC

Previous club:   DELTA FORCE FC   -   2017/2018

Current club: Kada City

References

1988 births
Living people
Nigerian footballers
Nigerian expatriate footballers
Expatriate footballers in Norway
Nigerian expatriate sportspeople in Norway
Expatriate footballers in Vietnam
Expatriate footballers in Tunisia
Nigerian expatriate sportspeople in Tunisia
Expatriate footballers in Benin
Nigerian expatriate sportspeople in Vietnam
Association football defenders
Association football midfielders